The Men's doubles competition at the 2023 FIL World Luge Championships was held on 28 January 2023.

Results
The first run was held at 08:28 and the second run at 10:05.

References

Men's doubles